Talia Bennett is a New Zealand TV Host, model and beauty pageant titleholder who was 1st runner-up at Miss New Zealand 2012. The winner of Miss New Zealand 2012 was Avianca Böhm. She was subsequently stripped of her crown and replaced by Bennett.

Early life
Bennett is a commercial property valuer whose personal interests include yoga, health, nutrition, fashion and tennis.

Miss New Zealand 2011
Bennett was first runner-up. Priyani Puketapu won the Miss New Zealand title.

Miss New Zealand 2012
Bennett was first runner-up for a second time. On 31 July 2012, Böhm was stripped of her crown, which was then awarded to Bennett.

References

External links
 Miss New Zealand Official website

Living people
Miss New Zealand winners
1980s births
Miss Universe 2012 contestants